Bülent Esel (23 July 1927 – 17 August 2004) was a Turkey international football forward who played for clubs in Turkey and Italy.

Career
Born in Izmir, Esel began playing youth football for Kırıkkalespor. He played senior football for Kırıkkalespor and Ankaragücü before moving to Italy in 1951, where he would make 78 appearances and scored 25 goals during three seasons in Serie A for SPAL 1907.

Esel returned to Turkey and spent the remainder of his career with Beşiktaş J.K., Vefa S.K. and Altınordu S.K.

Esel made four appearances for the Turkey national football team from 1949 to 1950.

Personal
Esel died on 17 August 2004.

References

External links
 
 
 Profile at Enciclopediadelcalcio.it

1927 births
2004 deaths
Turkish footballers
Turkey international footballers
MKE Ankaragücü footballers
Beşiktaş J.K. footballers
Vefa S.K. footballers
Altınordu F.K. players
S.P.A.L. players
Turkey under-21 international footballers
Association football forwards